Kimberlee Michelle Peterson (born May 8, 1980) is an American television and film actress.

Background
Peterson was born in Boise, Idaho, but raised  in Colorado. At the age of four, Peterson began her career as a child actress in episodes of Perry Mason. At the age of 15, she co-starred in Homecoming opposite Anne Bancroft.

Throughout the 1990s and 2000s, Peterson appeared in numerous television episodes. Peterson is the owner of Lotta Photography, a headshot photography business based in the San Fernando Valley.

Filmography

Film

Television

References

 http://www.inbaseline.com/person.aspx?person_id=818721

External links
 Kimberlee Peterson Website
 

Living people
1980 births
People from Boise, Idaho
Actresses from Colorado
American child actresses
21st-century American women